Nacoleia ochrizonalis is a moth in the family Crambidae. It was described by George Hampson in 1912. It is found in the Indian states of Sikkim and Assam.

References

Moths described in 1912
Taxa named by George Hampson
Nacoleia
Moths of Asia